The Ruffian is a 1983 French-Canadian crime adventure film written and directed by José Giovanni and starring Lino Ventura, Bernard Giraudeau and Claudia Cardinale. It is based on Giovanni's 1969 novel Les Ruffian.

Plot 

The film follows Aldo, an adventurer who works at a gold mine in Canada. The mine is attacked by bandits, who kill everyone except Aldo and two First Nations people. They seek revenge by killing the bandits and stealing back their gold. Having suspicion of the two First Nations people, Aldo then proceeds to run off without them, but then loses the gold in a river. He drives to his home Montreal to recruit his friends John and Gérard, and his wife Éléonore, to help him retrieve the gold from the river. Menwhile, the two First Nations people whom Aldo betrayed seek to recover the gold as well.

Cast 

 Lino Ventura as Aldo Sévenac
 Bernard Giraudeau as Gérard Jackson
 Claudia Cardinale as 	Catherine Hansen
 Pierre Frag as  John
 Béatrix Van Til as  Éléonore
 August Schellenberg  as Nelson Harting

References

External links

1980s adventure films
1980s crime films
French adventure films
French crime films
Canadian adventure films
Canadian crime drama films
Films based on works by José Giovanni
Films directed by José Giovanni
Films scored by Ennio Morricone
Films with screenplays by José Giovanni
Treasure hunt films
French-language Canadian films
1980s Canadian films
1980s French films